Leela Mahal Center  is a 2004 Indian Telugu-language action romance directed by Devi Prasad and starring Aryan Rajesh and Sadaf. The film is a remake of the 1999 Tamil film Amarkalam.

Plot 
Prabhu has a troubled childhood with divorced parents. His mother marries another man. Upset that he has to call his stepfather as his own father, he leaves his house at a young age. He grows up to be a thug who works at Leela Mahal Center, a cinema theatre. GK, a former Mumbai-based don, who was sent to jail by his own friend, Sudheer. GK tells Prabhu to kidnap Anjali, a violinist. She is initially disturbed by Prabhu and starts to fall in love with him after Singhamalai tells Anjali about Prabhu's past life. A terrorist gang comes to kidnap Anjali as a bargain for their fellow friends in jail. How Prabhu fights the gang and saves Anjali form the rest of the story. It is revealed that Anjali is none other than GK’s daughter. GK & Sudheer become friends again.

Cast 

Aryan Rajesh as Prabhu
Sadaf as Anjali
Atul Kulkarni as GK
Suman as Sudheer
Brahmanandam as Singhamalai, Prabhu's right hand man
Dharmavarapu Subramanyam as Leela Mahal Center's manager
Surya
Krishna Bhagawan as Bujji
Raghu Babu
M. S. Narayana
 Sheeba
Pragathi as Sudheer's wife
Surekha Vani as Prabhu's mother
Sameer Hasan as Prabhu's father
Karate Kalyani as Manga
Prudhvi Raj as Terrorist
Hema as GK's wife

Production 
The film is directed by Devi Prasad, who previously directed Aaduthu Paaduthu. The film got stuck in production before ultimately releasing in 2004. Aryan Rajesh, who plays the lead in the film was yet to reach the limelight prior to the film's release due to the box office failures of his previous films. In 2004 prior to the release of Donga Dongadi, Sadha, who starred in Jayam, was yet to bag stardom in the Telugu film industry.

Soundtrack 

The songs are composed by S. A. Rajkumar. The songs "Babuji Zara Dheere Chalo" from Dum and  "Mabbe Masakesindile" from Vayasu Pilichindi were combined for a song in the film. The lyrics were written by Suddala Ashokteja, Sai Sriharsha, and I.S. Murthy. The song "Thummeda Rekkalanadugu" rendered by S. P. Balasubrahmanyam  is based on the Telugu poem of the same name. In a review of the film's soundtrack, a critic from The Hindu stated that "A well-crafted (combined) effort by the composers and the lyricists ... gives music-loving Telugus some good compositions."

Release 
Unlike Rajesh's previous films, this film was a success at the box office. The Hindu wrote that "Aryan Rajesh performs the role with ease and Sada looks beautiful. Atul Kulkarni fares well". Idlebrain gave the film a rating of three out of five and wrote that " Devi Prasad should be appreciated for making a decent film in spite of undue delays and obstacles that dogged the progress of this film". Indiaglitz wrote that "Screenplay and Direction by debutant Devi Prasad is mediocre. But Devi Prasad shows promise in stylized presentation".

Notes

References

External links 

2004 films
2000s romantic action films
Films scored by S. A. Rajkumar
Telugu remakes of Tamil films
2000s Telugu-language films
Indian romantic action films